Jeny Rodriguez (born 7 August 1975) is a Honduran judoka. She competed in the women's lightweight event at the 1996 Summer Olympics.

References

1975 births
Living people
Honduran female judoka
Olympic judoka of Honduras
Judoka at the 1996 Summer Olympics
Place of birth missing (living people)